David Evans (born 9 November 1989) is an English professional darts player and previous BDO world Number 2 until 2020 and held a PDC tour card for 2 years, losing it at the end of 2022. David has won 3 Challenge Tour Titles and topped the Challenge Tour Order of Merit in 2020.

David played in the Professional Darts Corporation until the December 2022, after obtaining his Tour Card through topping the Challenge Tour Order Of Merit in 2020.

He now Plays on the PDC Challenge Tour across Germany and UK and ADC events across the UK. Also featuring on the Modus Super Series recently. 

David is a 3 x Challenge Tour Winner, and a 6 x participant of the UK Open.
He has played in 2 European Tour in Sindelfingen and Jena averaging over 100 on his debut.

Career
In September 2019, he qualified for the 2020 BDO World Darts Championship as the 14th seed, where he got to the quarter-finals on debut.
Dave also had a successful spell in his younger days whilst playing cricket, opening the bowling for Stacksteads Cricket Club in the Ribblesdale Cricket league.

World Championship results

BDO
 2020: Quarter-finals (lost to Mario Vandenbogaerde 3–5) (sets)

PDC
 2021: First round (lost to Ross Smith 0–3)

References

External links
 

Living people
English darts players
Professional Darts Corporation former tour card holders
1989 births